Joanna Narutowicz née Billewicz (Lithuanian: Joana Narutavičienė; born 21 March 1868 in Klyšiai, died 16 October 1926 in Vevey, Switzerland) − Polish-Lithuanian educational activist and the last owner of the manor in  Brewiki (Brevikiai, Lithuania). Born to the Billewicz family, Joanna was a cousin to Poland's first chief of state Józef Piłsudski and General Leon Billewicz. She married Stanisław Narutowicz, a noted Lithuanian politician of Polish descent, with whom she ran several cultural facilities. Notably she headed the gymnasium for girls in Telšiai. She was also the chairperson of the last Polish gymnasium in Kaunas, Lithuania. She left Lithuanian SSR after World War II and settled in Warsaw. She died there and was buried at Powązki Cemetery.

Biography 
She was from the Billewicz family as a daughter of Hipolit Billewicz and Helena, née Dowgird. She graduated in philosophy at the University of Zurich. In Switzerland, she became involved with radical leftist youth circles. After her studies, she returned to Lithuania and married Stanisław Narutowicz in 1888. In years 1890-91 she lived together with a husband in Warsaw. From 1891 to 1899 and 1904 to 1907, she worked as a teacher at a folk school in Samogitian Brewiki, where she taught peasant children in Lithuanian. In years 1899-1904 she lived in Kalisz, where she set up day care facilities for workers' children.

In 1907 she moved to Telšiai, where she became head of a progymnasium for girls. It was the first school of its kind in Lithuania, where Polish and Lithuanian were taught alongside Russian. During the First World War she evacuated to Smolensk Governorate, where in Roslavl she recreated Telšiai progymnasium. In 1918 she went back to Lithuania to teach peasant children once again.

From 1926 to 1935, she was headmistress of the Polish-language Adam Mickiewicz Gymnasium in Kaunas, appointed to the post by the Polish Educational Society Pochodnia. She was also protector of the Polish female academic corporation Znicz, founded in Kaunas in 1930. For health reasons, she retired from professional work in 1935.

During the Second World War she lived in Brewiki and helped Jews there to hide. In 1945, she came to Warsaw to live with her daughter Zofia Krassowska. She died on 19 February 1948 and is buried in Powązki Cemetery (cemetery section 131-5-3).

Marriage and children 
In 1888 she married Stanisław Narutowicz. They had four children:
 Zofia Krassowska (1893-1976), psychologist
 Jan (1896-1930), biologist
 Helena (1899-1942/43)
 Kazimierz (1904-?)

References

Sources 
 

1868 births
1948 deaths
People from Akmenė District Municipality
People from Shavelsky Uyezd
Burials at Powązki Cemetery
Polish educators
Joanna
20th-century Polish nobility
20th-century Polish landowners